Simone Peterzano (c. 1535–1599) was an Italian painter from Bergamo, but stressed his links to Venice where he probably trained. He painted in mannerist style and is mostly known as the master of Caravaggio.

Peterzano called himself a pupil of Titian and would sometimes sign his works titiani alumnus. He debuted in Milan with the counterfaçade frescoes in San Maurizio al Monastero Maggiore (1573), influenced by Veronese and Tintoretto. In the same year he painted two canvasses with Histories of Sts. Paul and Barnabas for the church of San Barnaba, also in Milan. Also from the same period are a Pietà in the church of San Fedele and a Pentecost for San Paolo Converso (now in Sant'Eufemia).

Between 1578 and 1582 Peterzano executed frescoes in the presbytery of Garegnano Charterhouse, considered one of his masterworks. In the same period he painted a Nativity with saints and angels in the church of Santa Maria di Canepanova in Pavia. His last works, characterized by a cold  monumental style, include a fresco with Stories of St. Anthony of Padua for the church of Sant'Angelo, a canvas with Madonna with Child and Saints for the parish church of Bioggio (Canton Ticino) and an altarpiece with St. Ambrose between Sts. Gervasius and Protasius in the Duomo of Milan (1592, now in the Pinacoteca Ambrosiana).

References

Sources

Graham-Dixon, Andrew (2011). Caravaggio: A Life Sacred and Profane. London: Penguin Books. p. 14.

External links
Painters of reality: The Legacy of Leonardo and Caravaggio in Lombardy, an exhibition catalogue from The Metropolitan Museum of Art (available online as PDF), which contains material on Peterzano (see index).

1540s births
1590s deaths
Painters from Bergamo
16th-century Italian painters
Italian male painters
Italian Mannerist painters